2nd Battalion, 23rd Marines (2/23) is a reserve infantry battalion in the United States Marine Corps located throughout the Western United States consisting of approximately 1000 Marines and Sailors.  They fall under the command of the 23rd Marine Regiment and the 4th Marine Division.

Current Units

Previous Units

Mission
Provide trained combat personnel and units to augment and reinforce the active component in time of war, national emergency, and at other times as national security requires.

History

World War II

Activated on 20 July 1942 at New River, North Carolina, 23rd Marines was assigned to the 4th Marine Division in February 1943 and relocated during July 1943 to Camp Pendleton, California. 23rd Marines participated in the following campaigns during World War II: Kwajalein, Saipan, Tinian, and Iwo Jima.

For Saipan the 23rd landed on beaches blue 1 & 2.  Shore party for 2/23 was the third battalion 20th Marines which was the 121st Seabees.

For Iwo Jima 2/23 was the right Assault Battalion on yellow beach.  They landed from APA 207 the USS Mifflin on yellow beach 2.  The 23rd did not have a Pioneer Battalion so the 133rd Seabees were attached to the Regiment in that assignment.  B Co. 133 NCB was Shore Party for 2/23 until relieved on D-plus 18.

During the fierce fighting which occurred in the Pacific Theater, four Marines of the 23rd Marine Regiment were awarded the Medal of Honor. In October 1945, the Regiment was again relocated to Camp Pendleton and was subsequently deactivated on 15 November 1945.

For its actions against enemy forces, 23rd Marines received the following awards: Presidential Unit Citation Streamer with one Bronze Star, Asia-Pacific Campaign Streamer with four Bronze Stars, and World War II Victory Streamer.

Vietnam

On 1 July 1962 2/23 was reactivated, reassigned to the 4th Marine Division and relocated to Santa Monica, California on property adjacent to the Santa Monica Airport. As a Marine Corps Reserve unit during Vietnam era, the battalion's weekend drills and annual two week training were often held at Marine Corps Base Camp Pendleton as well as other Southern California military installations that included Twentynine Palms, Coronado, and Port Hueneme.

In January, 1973 the battalion again relocated this time to Encino, California.

Gulf War
Six Marines were activated in late November 1990 from Fox Company in Salt Lake City, Utah. They left within five days to join 3rd Battalion, 23rd Marines whose headquarters is in the New Orleans, Louisiana area. From there they proceeded to Marine Corps Base Camp Lejeune for preparation before deploying to Al Jabail, Saudi Arabia. They proceeded into Kuwait where their final location was Hill 99, just outside Kuwait City. They were released from active duty in May 1991 and returned home.

In December 1990, 2nd Battalion, 23rd Marines was mobilized by presidential call-up to serve on active duty 99.2% of those on the rolls reported to their seven separate drill centers for duty. Within two days of activation, this, the largest and most geographically diverse infantry battalion in the Marine Corps, reported to Camp Pendleton, California with 1,015 Marine and Navy personnel. Unlike the standard 180-day forming and training period which most battalions require to prepare for deployment, 2/23 deployed within 16 days of activation and joined III MEF on 25 December 1990 in Okinawa, Japan.

Global War on Terror
After the terrorist attacks on 11 September 2001, 2nd Battalion, 23rd Marines was activated initially for one year to respond to any additional terrorist attacks that might occur in the United States. Just before its one-year deactivation date, the battalion's active duty status was extended in order for the unit to deploy to the Middle East to participate in the Iraq War.  2nd Battalion, 23rd Marines was the first complete infantry reserve battalion to deploy in support of the Iraq War.

2/23 pushed forward into Iraq on 20 March 2003. Among other locations, the battalion fought in An Nasiriyah assisting Task Force Tarawa's operations in that area after a U.S. Army convoy was ambushed and several soldiers were taken prisoner by insurgent forces. The battalion moved up Route 17 as part of Regimental Combat Team 1 (RCT-1) fighting in Al Gharraf and Al Fajr among other towns. The battalion suffered its only combat fatality in Al Fajr. The battalion continued north with RCT 1 and was part of the tactical feint at Al Kut. Ultimately traveling west to An Numaniyah where the 1st Marine Division crossed the Tigris River.  A few days later, on 8 April 2003, the battalion entered Baghdad with the Division. Fox Company found itself engaged in combat with approximately 200 Fedayeen and Iraqi intelligence personnel. A scout sniper attached to Fox company, Sergeant Scott Montoya, was awarded Navy Cross for "extraordinary heroism in combat" during this engagement. The next day Golf company moved to secure the Iraqi intelligence headquarters from which Fox Company had been attacked the previous day.  Once Baghdad was largely secure, Golf Company and an anti-tank section from Weapons Company became part of Task Force Tripoli, which was the Marine vanguard into Tikrit.

On 1 December 2008, 2nd Battalion, 23rd Marines, were activated for the Iraq War.  They deployed in and around the city of Ar Ramadi. During their deployment, contributions were made to Afghanistan and the withdraw of troops as the last participating Marine infantry force. With over 300 missions successfully completed 2/23 completed their deployment. Weapons company successfully completed missions out of Al-Taqaddum Air Base where they were part of the quick reaction force.

On 1 March 2011, the battalion deployed to Okinawa and served as a quick reaction force in support of Operation Enduring Freedom. The unit was attached to the 4th Marine Regiment as Alpha Company. 2/23 deployed all over Southeast Asia and participated in the Korean Incremental Training Program. The unit returned home in September 2011.

Reserve Unit Activation, 2018 
The 2nd Battalion, 23rd Marine Regiment will again head to Okinawa in October 2018 as part of the Corps Unit Deployment Program, according to an article in the Marine Times.

Unit Awards
2/23 has received several unit citations and commendations. Members who participated in actions that merited the award are authorized to wear the medal or ribbon on their uniforms. Awards and decorations of the United States Armed Forces fall into different categories: i.e. Service, Campaigns, Unit, and Valor. Unit awards are distinct from personal decorations. The following are 2/23's Unit Awards:
 
  Presidential Unit Citation  Iwo Jima, Operation Iraqi Freedom
  Navy Unit Commendation Tinian, Desert Storm, II MEF Iraq 2007
  Asiatic-Pacific Campaign Medal with 4 Arrowheads (World War II)
Navy Meritorious Unit Commendation 1990-91

See also

 List of United States Marine Corps battalions
 Organization of the United States Marine Corps
 4th Marine Division (United States)
 23rd Marine Regiment
 Headquarters Company 23d Marines (HQ/23) - San Bruno, California
 1st Battalion, 23rd Marines (1/23) - Ellington Field, Texas
 3rd Battalion, 23rd Marines (3/23) - Bridgeton, Missouri
 2nd Battalion, 24th Marines (2/24) - Chicago, Illinois
 Truck Company 23rd Marines - Nellis Air Force Base, Nevada
 Combat Logistics Battalion 23 formerly 4th Landing Support Battalion (aka the 4th Pioneers)
 Naval Mobile Construction Battalion 133
 Seabees

References

External links

 

4th Marine Division (United States)
Infantry battalions of the United States Marine Corps
Military units and formations of the Iraq War
Units and formations of the United States in the War in Afghanistan (2001–2021)